Goniodoris is a genus of sea slugs, specifically dorid nudibranchs, marine gastropod molluscs in the family Goniodorididae.

Species 
Species within the genus Goniodoris include:
 Goniodoris aspersa Alder & Hancock, 1864
 Goniodoris barroisi Vayssière, 1901
 Goniodoris brunnea Macnae, 1958
 Goniodoris castanea Alder & Hancock, 1845
 Goniodoris citrina Alder & Hancock, 1864 
 Goniodoris felis Baba, 1949 
 Goniodoris joubini Risbec, 1928 
 Goniodoris kolabana Winckworth, 1946 
 Goniodoris meracula  Burn, 1958 
 Goniodoris mercurialis  Macnae, 1958 
 Goniodoris mimula Marcus, 1955 
 Goniodoris modesta  Alder & Hancock, 1864 
 Goniodoris nodosa  (Montagu, 1808)  : type species (originally described as Doris nodosa  Montagu, 1808 )
 Goniodoris ovata Barnard, 1934
 Goniodoris petiti Crosse, 1875
 Goniodoris punctata  Bergh, 1905 
 Goniodoris sugashimae Baba, 1960 
 Goniodoris violacea  Risbec, 1928 
Species names currently considered to be synonyms:
 Goniodoris atromarginata (Cuvier, 1804): synonym of Doriprismatica atromarginata (Cuvier, 1804)
 Goniodoris bennetti Angas, 1864: synonym of Hypselodoris bennetti (Angas, 1864)
 Goniodoris coelestis Deshayes in Fredol, 1865: synonym of Felimare orsinii (Vérany, 1846)
 Goniodoris crossei Angas, 1864: synonym of Hypselodoris obscura (Stimpson, 1855)
 Goniodoris danielsseni Friele & Hansen, 1876: synonym of Lophodoris danielsseni (Friele & Hansen, 1876)
 Goniodoris daphne Angas, 1864: synonym of Goniobranchus daphne (Angas, 1864)
 Goniodoris elegans (Cantraine, 1835): synonym of Felimare picta (Schultz in Philippi, 1836)
 Goniodoris emarginata Forbes, 1840: synonym of Goniodoris nodosa (Montagu, 1808)
 Goniodoris festiva Angas, 1864: synonym of Mexichromis festiva (Angas, 1864)
 Goniodoris glabra Baba, 1937 : synonym of Goniodoris joubini Risbec, 1928
 Goniodoris godeffroyana (Bergh, 1977): synonym of Risbecia godeffroyana (Bergh, 1977)
 Goniodoris lamberti Crosse, 1875: synonym of Glossodoris lamberti (Crosse, 1875)
 Goniodoris loringi Angas, 1864: synonym of Goniobranchus loringi (Angas, 1864)
 Goniodoris mariei Crosse, 1872: synonym of Mexichromis mariei (Crosse, 1872)
 Goniodoris montrouzieri Crosse, 1875: synonym of Dendrodoris nigra (Stimpson, 1855)
 Goniodoris obscura Stimpson, 1855: synonym of Hypselodoris obscura (Stimpson, 1855)
 Goniodoris paretii  (Verany, 1846)  [synonym of Goniodoris castanea  Alder & Hancock, 1845]
 Goniodoris rossiteri  (Crosse, 1875) 
 Goniodoris souverbiei Crosse, 1875: synonym of Glossodoris souverbiei (Crosse, 1875)
 Goniodoris splendida Angas, 1864: synonym of Goniobranchus splendidus (Angas, 1864)
 Goniodoris trilineata A. Adams & Reeve, 1850: synonym of Mexichromis trilineata (A. Adams & Reeve, 1850)
 Goniodoris tryoni Garrett, 1873: synonym of Hypselodoris tryoni (Garrett, 1873)
 Goniodoris verrieri Crosse, 1875: synonym of Goniobranchus verrieri (Crosse, 1875)
 Goniodoris verrucosa Crosse in Angas, 1864: synonym of Thordisa verrucosa (Crosse in Angas, 1864)
 Goniodoris whitei A. Adams & Reeve, 1850: synonym of Hypselodoris whitei (A. Adams & Reeve, 1850)
Species transferred to other genera:
 Goniodoris danielsseni Friele & Hansen, 1876  transferred to Lophodoris

References 

 Gofas, S.; Le Renard, J.; Bouchet, P. (2001). Mollusca. in: Costello, M.J. et al. (Ed.) (2001). European register of marine species: a check-list of the marine species in Europe and a bibliography of guides to their identification. Collection Patrimoines Naturels. 50: pp. 180–213.

Goniodorididae